Felix Maximilian Reader (1850–1911) was a German-born Australian chemist and amateur botanist.

Born in Berlin, he trained as a chemist before emigrating to New Zealand, then shortly afterwards, in the 1880s, to Australia. In the 1890s he settled at Dimboola, Victoria, where he had a chemist's shop until the early 1900s. He was an enthusiastic botanist, publishing many papers in the Victorian Naturalist, establishing himself as an expert on the grasses of the southern Wimmera, and collecting the type specimen of Acacia glandulicarpa. He also amassed a large private herbarium, which he sold to the National Herbarium of Victoria in 1906. Brachycome readeri and Pottia readeri are named in his honour.

References

Further reading
 

1850 births
1911 deaths
Botanical collectors active in Australia
19th-century Australian botanists
German emigrants to Australia
Scientists from Berlin